County Route 516 (CR 516) is a county highway in the U.S. state of New Jersey.

Route description

The highway extends  from Route 18/CR 527 in Old Bridge Township to Route 36 in Middletown Township. It is known as Old Bridge-Matawan Road for its entire length in Old Bridge Township where it intersects U.S. Route 9 (US 9), and then continues several more miles to the Old Bridge/Matawan border, where it enters Monmouth County. There it is known as New Brunswick Avenue and forms part of the boundary between Matawan and Aberdeen before fully entering Matawan. Upon crossing Main Street (Route 79) it becomes known as Broad Street and continues past Route 34 to another junction with Main Street (County Route 516 Spur). From there it follows Main Street north into Aberdeen Township where it is known as Lower Main Street; the name changes again upon entering Keyport where it is Maple Place. 

In Keyport, CR 516 has a grade-separated junction with Route 35; part of this 1965 alignment follows West Fourth Street before rejoining Maple Place and following it to Green Grove Avenue. Turning east on Green Grove Avenue, CR 516 bridges Chingarora Creek and enters Hazlet Township where it is known as Middle Road, which intersects Route 36 and continues into Holmdel to the intersection of Laurel Avenue. It turns briefly south on Laurel Avenue, then has its second junction with Route 35. Running concurrent with Route 35 into Middletown Township, CR 516 then turns off onto Cherry Tree Farm Road and continues along that alignment to Leonardville Road, which it follows to its eastern terminus at Route 36 in Middletown Township.

County Route 516 Spur
A segment of Main Street in downtown Matawan – one block west of Broad Street (mainline CR 516) – is maintained by the county as a segment of County Route 516 Spur. On most county-maintained traffic signals along Main Street, it is signed as CR 516 though the signal at Little Street signs the road as "CR 516S."  The street extends  from the intersection of Route 79 and Route 34 to the intersection of Main and Broad Streets. 

Another  spur consists of Green Grove Avenue between Maple Place and First Street (County Route 6). Though heading west from Route 35 shows CR 516 making a left onto Maple Place, one CR 516 reassurance shield (without a "Spur" plaque) appears at Green Grove Avenue's intersection with First Street.

History
West of Matawan, the road was maintained by the Middlesex and Monmouth Turnpike Company.

Before the county route system, the road from Keyport to Atlantic Highlands was part of the Jersey Coast Way, which ran from the Staten Island Ferry to Cape May. CR 516 was established in 1952 as a part of the 500 Series system. It incorporated part of Middlesex County Route 3-R-14 between Old Bridge and the Monmouth County line. From Old Bridge to its junction with Route 4 (now Route 79), CR 516 was concurrent with Route S28, although always a county road. In 1953, Route S28 was renumbered as Route 18; the concurrency ended when Route 18 was realigned to the south. From the Monmouth County line it absorbed part of CR 6 through Matawan Borough and Matawan Township to Keyport. There it superseded CR 42 in its entirety. CR 42 consisted of Maple Place in Keyport between Route 35 and Green Grove Avenue. CR 42 was taken over as a county highway by resolution of the Board of Chosen Freeholders on June 21, 1939. Since 1952, no route in Monmouth County has been designated as CR 42. From CR 42, it continued east from Keyport east through Hazlet, Holmdel and Middletown Townships it used a part of CR 7 to its terminus.

CR 516 Alternate was previously the designation of Broad Street in Matawan, but was never signed differently than the parent route. Initially both Main and Broad Streets were designated as CR 516. Broad Street was then briefly renumbered as CR 516 Alternate, with Main Street remaining as the main stem. When CR 516 was rerouted from Main Street to Broad Street, and Main Street renumbered as CR 516 Spur, CR 516 Alternate ceased to exist.

Major intersections

See also

References

Resolution, June 21, 1939, Monmouth County Board of Chosen Freeholders
1940 Road Map of Monmouth County, Monmouth County Board of Chosen Freeholders
1952 Road Map of Monmouth County, Monmouth County Board of Chosen Freeholders

External links

NJ State Highways: CR 515-530

500-series county routes in New Jersey
Roads in Middlesex County, New Jersey
Roads in Monmouth County, New Jersey